Pemulwuy is a suburb in Greater Western Sydney, in the state of New South Wales, Australia. Pemulwuy is located 30 kilometres west of the Sydney central business district in the local government area of the Cumberland Council. Pemulwuy is home to the highest point between the Blue Mountains and Sydney, the summit of Prospect Hill.

The quarrying of blue metal, basalt and dolerite was abundant in the area in the past two centuries.  
Pemulwuy, formerly part of Prospect, is a relatively new suburb, with development beginning in 2004 on the site of a former Boral quarry and CSIRO sites.

History
Pemulwuy is named after the Aboriginal warrior, Pemulwuy, who led attacks on the British settlements in the surrounding areas, particularly on the Toongabbie settlement. When Captain-Lieutenant Watkin Tench made another official journey to the west in 1789, he began his journey with reference to Prospect Hill, which commanded a view of the great chain of mountains to the west. The first recorded ascent of Prospect Hill by a colonist is that of Tench and his party on 26 June 1789.

In 1791 Governor Arthur Phillip started granting plots of land (mostly ) to emancipated convicts in what is now Pemulwuy. Thirteen grants of land in the region were made in July 1791. In 1799 Ensign William Cummings of the New South Wales Corps was granted  at Prospect Hill. From its commencement in 1791 with the early settlement of the area, agricultural use of the land continued. Much of the land appears to have been cleared by the 1820s and pastoral use of the land was well established by then. When Governor Macquarie paid a visit to the area in 1810, he was favourably impressed by the comfortable conditions that had been created.

On 1 May 1801 Governor King took drastic action, issuing a public order requiring that Aboriginal people around Parramatta, Prospect Hill and Georges River should be "driven back from the settlers" habitations by firing at them'. In 1808 William Lawson was granted  on the western slopes of the west ridge where he was to build his home Veteran Hall. He then bought Cummings' grant and it was here that his third son, Nelson Lawson built a magnificent home, Grey Stanes, on the crown of Prospect Hill. Prompted by suggestions to the Reverend Samuel Marsden by local Prospect Aboriginal groups that a conference should take place "with a view of opening the way to reconciliation", Marsden promptly organised a meeting near Prospect Hill on 3 May 1805. The conference led to the end of the conflict for the Aboriginal clans around Parramatta and Prospect.

Prospect quarry

Quarrying in the area began in the 1820s and naturalist Charles Darwin visited the region in January 1836, to observe the geology. By the latter part of the nineteenth century coarse-grained picrite, and other doloritic rock types were being extracted from William Lawson's estate on the west and north sides of the Hill. By the early twentieth century, the land had been acquired by quarrying firms anxious to expand their land holdings near this valuable source of raw material. The bulk of the present CSIRO site was acquired by the Commonwealth in 1946, and a further 15 hectares was acquired in 1963. In the early 1950s the site became operational and sheep were pastured for research purposes. Prospect Hill was for many years the primary source of road stone for the city's expanding infrastructure until the reserves of dolerite were exhausted.

Quarrying companies gradually took over more and more of Prospect Hill, mining the dolerite for use as roadstone until it was almost all gone and much of the hill with it. The Prospect quarry is formed by an intrusion of dolerite rock into Ashfield Shale. At least seven different rock types occur in the intrusion. The material is predominantly coarse grained picrite with olivine-dolerite and dolerite. Roads were paved with grey dolerite from Prospect Hill as early as the 1820s. By the end of World War II, the quarries closed down except for two that had the best class of basalt.

Land development
As at 19 February 2001, the southern portion of the land, located within the Boral Brickworks site, has been extensively quarried; however the CSIRO site has largely retained its original surface form. In 2002 Delfin Lend Lease entered a joint venture with Boral to develop the residential lands. On 30 January 2004 the eastern part of Prospect, which includes the quarry gap, became a new suburb called Pemulwuy containing the new housing estates of Lakeside and Nelson's Ridge and the industrial area within the oval-shaped ridge of Prospect Hill. Nelson's Ridge is being developed by Lend Lease in two stages with the first comprising the northern employment and northern residential lands and the second comprising the southern equivalents. This site will eventually be integrated with the Nelson's Ridge development through Driftway Drive as well as cycleways and pedestrian links being established between the two.

Quarrying last occurred in 2007. Subsequently, the land inside the oval-shaped ridge was levelled from 2008 to 2010. The gap in the ridge that had previously been created by quarrying has been lowered to the floor level of the quarry and the drainage of the area reversed from its earlier northward flow to empty into Prospect Creek, while a new road, Reconciliation Road, has been driven through the centre of the hill and across the gap to Wetherill Park. In the early 2010s, the 330ha quarry gap was transformed into light industry area with several warehouse distribution centres being established by 2015. Prospect Highway now winds through the gap. The Northern Residential lands have been established since the early 2010s. As of 2021, the Southern Residential lands, which will be built on Prospect Hill's woody South-Top, are under construction.

Geography

Philip Gidley King mentions that the landscape of Prospect is "a very pleasant tract of country, which, from the distance the trees grew from each other, and the gentle hills and dales, and rising slopes covered with grass, appeared like a vast park. The soil from Rose Hill to Prospect-Hill is nearly alike, being a loam and clay." The tree cover was mainly the eucalypts, grey box and forest red gum. Spotted gum (Corymbia maculata) is also known to have occurred in the Prospect area.

Prospect Hill, which lies in the suburb, is Sydney's largest body of igneous rock and rises to a height of 117 metres above sea level. The Early Jurassic activity resulted in the shaping of the Prospect dolerite intrusion, which unequivocally points that the hill had a volcanic origin. The eroded residue of the volcanic core forms Prospect Hill, which was battered down over millions of years to a small bulge, which is a laccolith, in the generally flat lands of western Sydney.

The eastern portion consists in the most part of high density town-house like development, while the western area consists of very large warehouse and distribution facilities. The southern zone of the suburb is promoted by property developers Lend Lease Group as "Nelson's Ridge" named after Nelson Simmons Lawson, son of William Lawson, the owner of the Grey Stanes Estate. The northern zone of the suburb is promoted by Stockland as "Lakewood".

Street names in the suburb include Watkin Tench Parade, named after Captain Watkin Tench, who was the first European to record an ascent of Prospect Hill in 1789.

Climate

Demographics
According to the 2016 Census:
 The most common ancestries were Indian 13.3%, Australian 12.0%, English 9.1%, Chinese 6.8% and Filipino 5.7%. 
 46.1% of people only spoke English at home. Other languages spoken at home included Hindi 5.8%, Arabic 4.3%, Gujarati 3.7%, Mandarin 3.2% and Tagalog 2.8%%. 
 51.5% of people were born in Australia. The most common countries of birth were India 9.4%, Philippines 4.7%, Fiji 3.0%, China 2.7% and Sri Lanka 2.6%.	
 The most common responses for religion were Catholic 33.3%, Hinduism 15.2%, No Religion 12.6%, Islam 8.1% and Not Stated 7.3%.
According to the 2011 Census:
 The most common ancestries were Australian 15.0%, English 10.8%, Indian 10.3%, Filipino 8.3% and Chinese 6.2%. 
 48.9% of people only spoke English at home. Other languages spoken at home included Hindi 6.0%, Arabic 4.2%, Tagalog 3.8%, Gujarati 2.8% and Cantonese 2.7%. 
 52.4% of people were born in Australia. The most common countries of birth were India 7.2%, Philippines 6.7%, Fiji 3.6%, Sri Lanka 2.5% and England 1.5%.	
 The most common responses for religion were Catholic 40.2%, Hinduism 11.8%, No Religion 9.7%, Anglican 7.3% and Islam 6.9%.

Commercial area
The Pemulwuy Marketplace is located on the intersection of Greystanes Road and Butu Wargun Drive along with a community centre and child care centre. Ornamented by lomandras and eucalyptus trees, the marketplace features a Woolworths and a BWS outlet. Another shopping centre, called Nelsons Ridge Plaza, is located on Watkin Tench Parade.

Parks and reserves

The suburb is home to many parks and reserves such as:

Grey Box Reserve
Dirrabari Reserve (including dog park)
Driftway Reserve
Andrew Campbell Reserve
Marrong Reserve or Pemulwuy Lookout (highest point of the suburb featuring a lookout, native plants and public seating, although currently accessible only by foot or bicycle, due to road closures.)
Ridgeline Reserve
Wittama Park
Nelson Square

Transport
The area is served by the Transit Systems Sydney 809 bus services from Merrylands, 810- until Apr 18 2021, 810x, 811- until Apr 18, 2021, and 811x bus services from Parramatta and 800 and 812 bus service from Blacktown to Fairfield. The barriers on Butu Wargun Drive mean that those living in the eastern portion, and working in the western must either walk or cycle over the ridge, or drive via the Great Western Highway to the north of the suburb, and Reconciliation Road.

Pemulwuy is a 5-minute drive to the M4 and 10-minute drive to Parramatta. Merrylands railway station and Pendle Hill railway station are only a few minutes drive away.

References

Suburbs of Sydney
Cumberland Council, New South Wales
City of Parramatta